Georgi Ermolayevich Proskurin (13 June 1945 – 10 July 2004) was a Soviet pair skater. He was born in Moscow. With Galina Karelina, he is the 1971 European bronze medalist. With Tatiana Tarasova, he won the 1966 Winter Universiade, which he repeated again in 1972 with Karelina. In total, he is a five-time Soviet national medalist with Karelina, Tarasova, and Galina Sedova.

Competitive highlights

With Karelina

With Tarasova

With Sedova

References 

 Skatabase: European Championships  »  Pairs 1960-1969
 Skatabase: European Championships  »  Pairs 1970-1979
 Skatabase: World Championships  »  Pairs 1960-1969
 Skatabase: World Championships  »  Pairs 1970-1979
 Biography of Georgi Proskurin 

1945 births
2004 deaths
Soviet male pair skaters
Russian male pair skaters
Figure skaters from Moscow
European Figure Skating Championships medalists
Universiade medalists in figure skating
Universiade gold medalists for the Soviet Union
Competitors at the 1966 Winter Universiade